A list of films produced in Peru in year order. For a list of films A-Z currently with an article on Wikipedia see :Category:Peruvian films.

1910s

1920s

1930s

1940s

1950s

1960s

1970s

1980s

1990s

2000s

2010s

2020s

Note

See also
 Cinema of Peru
 Media of Peru
 List of Peruvian submissions for the Academy Award for Best International Feature Film
 Elcine
 Lima Film Festival
 
 
 Latin American cinema

References 

Peru

Films